China Town is a 1962 Indian Hindi-language romantic comedy thriller film directed and produced by Shakti Samanta. Written by Ranjan Bose and with music by Ravi. It is a black-and-white movie, starring Shammi Kapoor in a double role, as a gangster and his look-alike. Shakila is the leading lady, alongside Helen in a supporting role. The film was remade in Tamil as Kudiyirundha Koyil (1968), starring M. G. Ramachandran and in Telugu as Bhale Thammudu (1969), starring N. T. Rama Rao. 
Prem Naseer's 1981 Malayalam movie  Theekkali was also loosely based on this movie.

Plot 
Shekhar (Shammi Kapoor), a young singer, lives in Darjeeling with his widowed mother. He is in love with Rita (Shakila), the only daughter of the wealthy Rai Bahadur Digamberprasad Rai. Rai does not approve of Shekhar and wants his daughter to marry a wealthy Calcutta-based businessman named Chowdhry. Rita asks Shekhar to get a better position, but Shekhar is quite satisfied with his singing career. So Rita and her father relocate to Calcutta, and Shekhar follows them. An enraged Rai complains to the police, who arrest Shekhar and hold him for questioning. However, the police notice his resemblance to a China Town gangster named Mike (also played by Shammi Kapoor), who they are holding in custody. Because Mike refuses to talk, the police convince Shekhar to impersonate him in order to infiltrate the Chinatown criminal ring. Meanwhile, Shekhar's mother reveals to him that Mike may be his long-lost brother Shankar, kidnapped by gangsters as a boy. Shekhar accordingly takes over Mike's life, but there is one thing he and the police overlooked – namely Mike – who escapes from police custody with the help of Rita, who mistakes him for Shekhar. Mike's girlfriend Suzy (Helen) finds out Shekhar's true identity, but spares him when he reveals that Mike is alive and captured by the police, and sympathizes with him after learning that Mike was his long-lost brother. The gangsters overhear this and capture Shekhar, his life is only spared after he tells Mike his true background and the two brothers capture the gang's leader. As a result, Shekhar gets a permanent police job that allows him to marry Rita and Mike receives a reduced sentence of three years.

Cast 
 Shammi Kapoor as Shekhar / Shankar / Mike (Double Role)
 Shakila as Rita Rai
 Helen as Suzy
 Madan Puri as Joseph Wong
 S. N. Banerjee as Rai Bahadur Digamberprasad Rai 
 Kanu Roy as Sr.Inspector Datta
 Mridula Rani as Shekhar & Shankar's Mother
 Rashid Khan as Sundaram (Mahakali's Husband)
 M.B. Shetty as Ching Lee
 Keshav Rana as Usman
 Tun Tun as Mahakali (Hotel Landlady)
 Gautam Mukherjee
 Samson
 Keshto Mukherjee as Keshto
 Suvojit Saha As Pagla Mao
 Jeevan Kala as Shanti
 Polson as Bholu
 Sujit Kumar as Inspector in Calcutta

Soundtrack 
The movie soundtrack didn't have a grand impact on the Indian Populace, but select songs from the albums were declared hits and a track by the name of "Baar Baar Dekho" by Mohammed Rafi went on to become a classic, which is remembered and hummed still to date. The Music of the film was by Ravi and the lyrics were penned by veteran Majrooh Sultanpuri. Almost all the songs were rendered by Mohammed Rafi and Asha Bhosle.

Box office 
It was declared a "semi-hit" by Box Office India.

References

External links 
 

1960s Hindi-language films
1962 films
Films set in Kolkata
Hindi films remade in other languages
Films directed by Shakti Samanta
Films scored by Ravi
1960s spy comedy films
Indian spy comedy films
Indian comedy thriller films
Indian black-and-white films